Kenny Dyer (born 7 September 1964) is a football player and former coach. Born in England, he earned four caps for the Montserrat national team.

Playing career
Dyer played youth football for Arsenal, Tottenham Hotspur and Charlton Athletic, before playing senior football with Maidstone United, Chatham Town, Dover Athletic, Dagenham & Redbridge, Slough Town and Hayes.

Dyer also played professionally in Cyprus, for clubs including Ethnikos Achna and Nea Salamis Famagusta.

Dyer has represented the Montserrat national team at international level, including three games at the 2010 Caribbean Championship at the age of 46.

Coaching career
Dyer managed English non-league side Haringey Borough between 2004 and 2005. Dyer coached the Montserrat national team in 2008.
He resigned in 2013 expressing disappointment with the game's administration.
Dyer also coached the Montserrat under-21 side in 2006.

References

External links
 

1964 births
Living people
Montserratian footballers
Association football midfielders
Montserrat international footballers
Cypriot First Division players
Arsenal F.C. players
Tottenham Hotspur F.C. players
Charlton Athletic F.C. players
Maidstone United F.C. (1897) players
Chatham Town F.C. players
Nea Salamis Famagusta FC players
Dover Athletic F.C. players
Ethnikos Achna FC players
Dagenham & Redbridge F.C. players
Slough Town F.C. players
Hayes F.C. players
Montserratian football managers
Haringey Borough F.C. managers
Montserrat national football team managers
Montserratian expatriate footballers
Montserratian expatriate sportspeople in Cyprus
Expatriate footballers in Cyprus